Hiran Chatterjee is a Tollywood film actor and a Member of West Bengal Legislative Assembly from Kharagpur Sadar. He has been working with the non-governmental organisation, Voice of World, which provides aid to visually and physically challenged street children.

Early life and education
Chatterjee was a resident of Uluberia, a sub-divisional town of Howrah, where he spent his childhood. He started his career as a Senior Manager at Reliance Industries at Mumbai.

Political career 

He was elected as a member of the West Bengal Legislative Assembly from Kharagpur Sadar (constituency). He defeated Pradip Sarkar of All India Trinamool Congress by 3,771 votes in 2021 West Bengal Assembly election. He was elected as a councillor for Ward 33 of Kharagpur Municipality in West Bengal Municipal Elections, 2022.

Awards
 Best Action Hero Award from Anandalok for Nabab Nandini in 2008.

Filmography

References

External links 
 

1985 births
21st-century Indian male actors
Bengali male actors
Living people
Male actors in Bengali cinema
Male actors from Kolkata
People from Howrah district
Trinamool Congress politicians from West Bengal
Bharatiya Janata Party politicians from West Bengal
West Bengal MLAs 2021–2026
Indian actor-politicians